Jakrapan Thanathiratham (born 22 February 1982) is a former Thai badminton player from Chiang Mai Province. Thanathiratham was the boys' singles bronze medalist at the 2000 Asian Junior Championships in Kyoto, Japan. He trained at the RBAC badminton club.

Achievements

Asian Junior Championships 
Boys' singles

IBF International
Men's singles

Men's doubles

References

External links
 

1982 births
Living people
Jakrapan Thanathiratham
Jakrapan Thanathiratham
Badminton players at the 2002 Asian Games
Jakrapan Thanathiratham
Competitors at the 2001 Southeast Asian Games
Competitors at the 2005 Southeast Asian Games
Jakrapan Thanathiratham
Southeast Asian Games medalists in badminton
Jakrapan Thanathiratham